Western Energy Alliance is a regional, non-profit trade association that focuses on energy and public land issues in the thirteen-state Intermountain West of the United States. Founded in 1974 as the Independent Petroleum Association of Mountain States (IPAMS), WEA represents about 200 independent natural gas and oil producers.

WEA advocates the benefits of increased domestic natural gas and oil production from the Intermountain West as a way to reduce greenhouse gases and decrease the U.S. dependence on foreign energy. WEA primarily focuses its efforts on federal policy and regulatory interests, including access to federal lands for exploration and production, federal agency permitting, air and water quality, wildlife conservation, health and safety, taxation, and other issues.

WEA also provides public and media relations support through a wide variety of media and community outreach efforts. As a regional trade-association, WEA has become a source for information and statistical analysis for the natural gas and oil industry in the Western United States.

In January 2021, shortly after Joe Biden assumed office, it paused oil and gas leases on federal lands due to climate change concerns. Denver-based WEA filed a lawsuit to prevent such implementation, claiming it would kill almost 59,000 jobs in 8 western states.  The current President of Western Energy Alliance is Kathleen Sgamma.

Sources 

Independent Petroleum Association of America (IPAA), “Reports & Statistics: Oil & Gas in Your State”

Trade associations based in the United States
1974 establishments in the United States
Organizations established in 1974